The Indianapolis Artsgarden is a glassed dome spanning the intersection of Washington and Illinois streets in downtown Indianapolis, Indiana. It serves not only as a pedestrian connector between Circle Centre Mall and nearby office buildings and hotels but also as a venue for the display and performance of artistic and musical works (more than 300 performances take place in the Artsgarden each year). In addition, the Artsgarden houses the Cultural Concierge, which provides local arts and cultural information, maps, and visitor guides. The structure, including the walkways connecting it to the adjacent buildings, is owned and operated by the Arts Council of Indianapolis.

The Artsgarden was designed by Ehrenkrantz Eckstut & Kuhn Architects who also designed the adjacent Circle Centre Mall. Blackburn Architects collaborated on the design and execution. The $12 million cost was funded by the Lilly Endowment.

The design yields a total free-span length of  within the dome. The entire dome is set on two pairs of  plate girders that diagonally span the intersection.

When initially constructed in 1995, the Artsgarden connected the second level of Circle Centre Mall on the southeast corner of the intersection with an upper level of the Claypool Courts on the northwest corner, while stairways provided access to the ground-level sidewalks on the northeast and southwest corners. In 2006, the Conrad Indianapolis was built on the site of the small park that had been on the northeast corner and the stairway there was replaced with a direct connection to the hotel. In 2011 construction was started on a connector to the 16-story PNC Center and Hyatt Regency hotel complex on the southwest corner. The owners of the complex in 1995 had declined to help pay for the connector; in 2010 an agreement was reached to split the $1.2 million cost, completing the original concept of the Artsgarden. The connector was completed in January 2012.

References

External links

Official website
Artsgarden at Emporis

Buildings and structures completed in 1995
Culture of Indianapolis
Buildings and structures in Indianapolis
Tourist attractions in Indianapolis
Art museums and galleries in Indiana
1995 establishments in Indiana